Pomace spirit (or pomace brandy) is a liquor distilled from pomace that is left over from winemaking, after the grapes are pressed. It is called marc in both English and French, but "grappa" in Italian and "bagaço" in Portuguese. In Spanish it is called orujo. Alcohol derived from pomace is also used as the traditional base spirit of other liquors, such as some anise-flavored spirits. Unlike wine brandy, most pomace brandies are neither aged nor coloured.

Production

Pomace may be either fermented, semi-fermented, or unfermented. During red wine vinification, the pomace is left to soak in the must for the entire fermentation period and is thus fermented; fermented pomace is particularly suitable for the production of pomace brandy, as it is soft, dry, and has a high alcohol content. Semi-fermented pomace is produced during rosé wine vinification; the pomace is removed before fermentation is complete. Virgin pomace, which is produced during white wine vinification, is not fermented at all.

The pomace is then fermented to completion and the alcohol is then distilled off to produce the pomace brandy.

Varieties

France 
 Marc d'Alsace
 Marc d’Auvergne 
 Marc de Beaujolais
 Marc de Bourgogne
 Marc de Provence
 Marc de Savoie
 Marc d'Irouléguy
 Marc du Jura
 Marc des Côtes-du-Rhône
 Marc de Châteauneuf-du-Pape
 Marc de Gigondas
 Marc de muscat de Beaumes-de-Venise
 Marc du Bugey
 Marc de Champagne
 Marc de Lorraine
 Marc du Languedoc 
 Grappa de Corse

In other countries 
 Bulgaria: Dzhibrovitsa (type of rakia)
 Chile: Aguardiente de Chillán
 Crete: Tsikoudia (also known as raki)
 Cyprus: Zivania
 Georgia: Chacha
 Germany: Tresterbrand
 Greece: Tsipouro
 Hungary: Törkölypálinka
 Italy: Grappa
 Portugal: Bagaceira
 Serbia and the Balkans: Komovica
 North Macedonia: Komova rakija
 Slovakia: Vínovica (also known as Terkelica)
 Slovenia: Tropinovec
 Spain: Orujo
 Switzerland: Marc, Grappa
 Romania: Tescovină
 Turkey: Rakı

References

 
Distilled drinks